Okai is a surname. Notable people with the surname include:

Atukwei Okai (1941–2018), Ghanaian poet and academic
, Japanese singer, actress, model and television personality
Jason M. Okai (born 1970), American attorney, educator, artist
Julian Okai (born 1993), English footballer
Lawrence Okai (born 1934), Ghanaian military officer
Nii Okai (born 1977), Ghanaian singer
Samuel Okai (born 1936), Ghanaian footballer
Sheila Okai (born 1979), Ghanaian women's footballer
Stephen Okai (born 1989), Ghanaian footballer
Edmund Okai (Ghanaian Sports Journalist)

Japanese-language surnames